Ho Vann is a Cambodian politician. He belongs to the Cambodia National Rescue Party and was elected to represent Phnom Penh in the National Assembly of Cambodia in 2003 and re-elected most recently in 2013.

References

1947 births 
Members of the National Assembly (Cambodia)
Cambodia National Rescue Party politicians 
Candlelight Party politicians
Living people
Royal University of Law and Economics alumni 
People from Takéo province